In the 2017 election, the Social Democrats had won the mayor's position, a gain from the Conservatives who had held it in the previous term. 

In this election, the Social Democrats and Venstre would both suffer 2 and 4 seat losses respectively. Green Left and Conservatives would on the other hand, gain 2 and 4 seats respectively. The election result still saw a slim red bloc majority however, and this helped Kirsten Jensen secure a 3rd full term as mayor.

Electoral system
For elections to Danish municipalities, a number varying from 9 to 31 are chosen to be elected to the municipal council. The seats are then allocated using the D'Hondt method and a closed list proportional representation.
Hillerød Municipality had 19 seats in 2021

Unlike in Danish General Elections, in elections to municipal councils, electoral alliances are allowed.

Electoral alliances  

Electoral Alliance 1

Electoral Alliance 2

Electoral Alliance 3

Electoral Alliance 4

Results

Notes

References 

Hillerød